The Las Vegas Grammar School on Las Vegas Boulevard, also known as the Historic Fifth Street School, is a school listed on the National Register of Historic Places in Nevada and is located in the city of Las Vegas.  The school sits on a  site on Las Vegas Boulevard. After the renovations, the main entrance and address for the school will be changed to Fourth Street.(The official Address as of 2008 is now 401 S. Fourth St. Ste. 145 Las Vegas, NV 89101) City of Las Vegas Historic Fifth Street School

History 
The school, also known as the Historic Fifth Street School since it was located on Fifth Street (now Las Vegas Boulevard), was constructed in 1936.

The building was added to the National Register of Historic Places on May 20, 1988.

The school has undergone an extensive $9.5 million renovation. The interior has been configured to allow its return as an education facility.  The school is home to:

City of Las Vegas - Office of Cultural Affairs
Nevada School of Arts
UNLV School of Architecture's Downtown Design Center
 Las Vegas Chapter of the American Institute of Architects

On November 28, 2007, a fire started by a homeless person damaged a portion of the roof and left smoke damage in the interior of the building.

See also
Las Vegas Grammar School (Washington and D Streets, Las Vegas, Nevada), also NRHP-listed

References

External links 

City of Las Vegas, Office of Cultural Affairs
Historic Fifth Street School Information
Fifth Street School Building information / from the UNLV Architecture Studies Library
City of Las Vegas web site

National Register of Historic Places in Las Vegas
Defunct schools in Nevada
Schools in Las Vegas
School buildings on the National Register of Historic Places in Nevada
School buildings completed in 1936
1936 establishments in Nevada